Manawatu Rugby League was formed in 1957. They are currently part of the Mid-Central zone along with Taranaki Rugby League.

Kiwi Players
Only one player from Manawatu has ever made the New Zealand national rugby league team. This was Kiwi number 456, Dick Uluave, who played two tests in 1979.

National Competitions

In 1997 Manawatu had a team in the Lion Red Cup. This team was known as the Manawatu Mustangs.

Between 2002 and 2007 Manawatu Rugby League fielded a side in the national Bartercard Cup. This team was known as the Central Falcons. However Manawatu was not invited to field a side in 2008's new Bartercard Premiership.

Regional Competitions

Western Alliance

Western Alliance was created in 2003 when clubs from Taranaki, Wellington and Manawatu competed in a 12-team regional competition. However, in 2004 all Wellington clubs pulled out to work on their own local competition. In 2007 Kia Ora Warriors ended Waitara's two-year reign as Western Alliance champion with a resolute, 29-20 win in the grand final.

Teams that competed in the 2007 Western Alliance were: 
 Waitara Bears 
 Linton Cobras 
 Feilding Falcons 
 Coastal Cobras 
 Marist Dragons
 Western Suburbs Tigers
 Kia Ora Warriors
 Hawera Hawks 
 Taitoko United
 Castlecliff Seagulls

Premier Grade
 Castlecliff Seagulls 
 Kia Ora Warriors
 Feilding Falcons
 Taitoko United 
 Linton Cobras
 Foxton Rebels

Cartown Cup
 Marton Bears
 Waiouru Bobcats 
 Linton Cobras
 Taitoko United
 Wanganui Vikings 1
 Whiti Te Ra
 Kia Ora Warriors
 Foxton Rebels 
 Dannevirke Tigers 
 Wanganui Vikings 2

References

Rugby league governing bodies in New Zealand
Rugby league in Manawatū-Whanganui